TES Australia is a free teaching resources website with over 565,000 resources. It launched in July 2013.

History 

TES Australia is owned and operated by TES Connect, it is the world's largest supplier of educational teacher exchange resources. TES Connect was launched in April 2006 to provide teachers with a way to share and find resources.

TES Australia was developed and launched in partnership with the Board of Studies, the Australian Education Union and the Centre for Professional Learning New South Wales to offer a free online platform for high-quality teaching resources mapped to the Australian curriculum.

Resources and Community 

TES Australia launched with over 565,000 resources arranged by stage, subject and topic. As well as pre-school/early childhood, primary and secondary-level resources, the site also has resources suitable for whole school topics and for children with special educational needs.

Teachers can also get news and information about the Australian Curriculum in a dedicated information centre.

In addition, TES Australia has a community section, where teachers can join groups, discuss topics in forums or write their own blogs

Ownership 

TES Connect is run by TES Global, which has been owned by TPG Capital LLP since 2013

See also 
 Times Educational Supplement
 Share My Lesson

References

External links 
 
 TES Connect
 TPG Capital LLP

Australian educational websites